The Brazil women's national volleyball team is administrated by the Confederação Brasileira de Voleibol (CBV) and takes part in international volleyball competitions. It is ranked second in the FIVB World Rankings as of August 2021. They are the current record holder of FIVB World Grand Prix champion titles, having won it for the eleventh time in 2016 and are the gold medalists of the 2008 Summer Olympics in Beijing and 2012 Summer Olympics in London. The team also get a gold in Pan American Games in 2011

Results

Olympic Games

 Champions   Runners up   Third place   Fourth place

World Championship

 Champions   Runners up   Third place   Fourth place

World Cup
 Champions   Runners up   Third place   Fourth place

World Grand Champions Cup 

 Champions   Runners up   Third place   Fourth place

World Grand Prix

 Champions   Runners up   Third place   Fourth place

Nations League
 Champions   Runners up   Third place   Fourth place

Pan American Games
 Champions   Runners up   Third place   Fourth place

Pan-American Cup
 Champions   Runners up   Third place   Fourth place

South America Championship
 Champions   Runners up   Third place   Fourth place

1951 and 1956 played best of three sets.

U23 team

World Championship
  Gold: 2015

South America Championship
  Gold: 2014, 2016

U20 team

World Championship
  Gold: 1987, 1989, 2001, 2003, 2005, 2007
  Silver: 1991, 1995, 1999, 2011, 2015
  Bronze: 2009, 2013

South America Championship
  Gold: 1972, 1974, 1976, 1978, 1984, 1990, 1992, 1994, 1996, 1998, 2000, 2002, 2004, 2006, 2008, 2010, 2012, 2014, 2016
  Silver: 1980, 1982, 1986, 1988

U18 team

World Championship
  Gold: 1997, 2005, 2009
  Silver: 1989, 1991, 1999, 2001
  Bronze: 2003, 2013

South America Championship
  Gold: 1982, 1984, 1986, 1988, 1990, 1992, 1994, 1998, 2000, 2002, 2004, 2006, 2008, 2010, 2014, 2016
  Silver: 1978, 1980, 1996, 2012

U16 team

South America Championship
  Gold: 2011, 2013

Team

Current squad
The following is the Brazilian roster as of 2022:

Head coach: José Roberto Guimarães

Notable players

 Ana Beatriz Moser
 Ana Margarida Alvares (Ida)
 Ana Paula Connelly
 Ana Paula Lima
 Andrea Moraes
 Andreia Marras
 Camila Brait
 Caroline Gattaz
 Danielle Lins
 Edna Veiga
 Erika Coimbra
 Estefania Souza
 Fabiana Berto
 Fabiana Claudino
 Fabiana Oliveira 
 Fernanda Doval
 Fernanda Garay 
 Fernanda Venturini
 Gabriela Guimarães 
 Hélia Souza (Fofão)
 Hilma Caldeira
 Jackie Silva
 Jaqueline Carvalho
 Janina Conceiçao
 Leila Barros
 Marcia Cunha (Marcia Fu)
 Maria Isabel Alencar 
 Marianne Steinbrecher 
 Natália Pereira
 Paula Pequeno
 Sheilla Castro
 Tandara Caixeta
 Thaisa Menezes
 Vera Mossa
 Virna Dias
 Walewska Oliveira
 Welissa Gonzaga (Sassá)

See also

Brazil men's national volleyball team
Brazil women's national under-23 volleyball team
Brazil women's national under-20 volleyball team
Brazil women's national under-18 volleyball team

References

External links
Official website
FIVB profile

 
National women's volleyball teams
Volleyball in Brazil
V
World champion national volleyball teams